Kristoforas may refer to:
Lithuanian variant of the given name Christopher
Kristoforas Award, a Lithuanian theatre award